Lars Tjugum Sørlien (born 12 April 1980) is a retired Norwegian football midfielder.

Coming through the junior ranks of Kongsvinger, he made his senior debut in the 1998 UEFA Intertoto Cup against FC Twente. He did not become a team regular until Kongsvinger were relegated to the 1. divisjon. In addition to 62 league games he featured in 3 cup games. In 2003 he moved to the Trondheim university sports club NTNUI, finishing his career in neighboring team Nidelv IL.

References

1980 births
Living people
Norwegian footballers
Kongsvinger IL Toppfotball players
Association football midfielders
Norwegian First Division players